The Permanent Representative of Sweden to the United Nations is in charge of the Sweden's diplomatic mission to the United Nations Headquarters in New York City, United States.

Gunnar Hägglöf, 1947–1948 
Sven Grafström, 1948–1952 
Oscar Thorsing, 1952–1956 
Gunnar Jarring, 1956–1958 
Agda Rössel, 1958–1964 
Sverker Åström, 1964–1970 
Olof Rydbeck, 1970–1977 
Anders Thunborg, 1977–1982 
Anders Ferm, 1982–1988 
Jan Eliasson, 1988–1992 
Peter Oswald, 1992–1997 
Hans Dahlgren, 1997–2000 
Pierre Schori, 2000–2004 
Anders Lidén, 2004–2010
Mårten Grunditz, 2010–2015
Olof Skoog, 2015–2019
Anna Karin Eneström, 2019-

See also 
List of current Permanent Representatives to the United Nations
Foreign relations of Sweden

References

External links 
Permanent Mission of Sweden to the United Nations, official website

United Nations

Sweden